Arabia is a Finnish ceramics company, founded in 1873 by Rörstrand, and currently owned by Fiskars. Arabia has specialized in kitchenware and tableware.

The original Arabia porcelain factory was located in Toukola (Helsinki). It later housed the Aalto University School of Arts, Design and Architecture.

Ulla Procopé, Esteri Tomula and Kaj Franck were among the best-known artists and designers for the company.

In 2016 the Arabia factory in Finland closed. All Arabia products are now made in Thailand and Romania.

Noted designers
Ulla Procopé
Esteri Tomula
Kaj Franck
Heikki Orvola
Birger Kaipiainen
Friedl Kjellberg
 Raija Uosikkinen (1923–2004)
Inkeri Leivo (1944–2010)
Heljä Liukko-Sundström (1938–)
Richard Lindh (1929–2006)
Tove Slotte

See also
Arabianranta
Porcelain manufacturing companies in Europe

References

External links 

Arabia website
 Arabia history - profile at FinnishDesign.com

Finnish design
Ceramics manufacturers
Finnish brands
Kitchenware brands
Manufacturing companies of Finland
Companies based in Helsinki
Culture in Helsinki
Fiskars
Wärtsilä